"High Fashion" is a song by American rapper Roddy Ricch, featuring production from American producer Mustard. The song was released on May 19, 2020 as the fifth single from Ricch's debut studio album Please Excuse Me for Being Antisocial (2019). It marks Ricch and Mustard's second collaboration, following the Grammy-nominated "Ballin".

A love song, "High Fashion" incorporates 90s R&B, with Ricch employing high-pitched vocals, which were compared to the work of Young Thug.
The song simultaneously topped four Billboard airplay charts: R&B/Hip-Hop Airplay, Rap Airplay, Rhythmic Songs and the Mainstream R&B/Hip-Hop chart.

Composition
"High Fashion" is a piano-driven West Coast hip hop song influenced by 90s R&B. According to NME, it is "a loating thug-love song" that comprises "tranquiliser-like" piano chords, which "float atop lofty 808s and snare." Lyric-wise, Ricch "devotes his lyrics to a fashionable love interest that has held him down both in the streets and in bed. Roddy chooses to spoil his lover while serenading her with memorable hook and witty verses". As noted by Billboards Heran Mamo, Ricch "raps about his girl's favorite designers that he uniquely abbreviates while name-dropping other brands throughout the track".

Critical reception
In NME, Kyann-Sian Williams opined that Mustard's production "will put you under a spell", while Ricch's high-pitched vocal "works a charm" on the song. Josh Svetz of HipHopDX noticed that the song features "2010s trap love song vibe and an instantly recitable hook" that "soundtracks the slow and sensual grind session at the club, while not losing radio-friendly appeal." Svetz further commented that Ricch "hits the notes only Young Thug would dare try, yet never comes off as biting Jeffrey's signature style." In Pitchfork, Pierre Alphonse also compared it to Young Thug's work "so egregious that it probably could have been generated by an AI, but he sings his heart out."

Chart performance
"High Fashion" marked Roddy Ricch's third number-one on Billboards Rap Airplay, Rhythmic Songs and Mainstream R&B/Hip-Hop charts, topping those charts simultaneously on June 13, 2020. It followed "The Box", and another Mustard collaboration, 2019's "Ballin". On the R&B/Hip-Hop Airplay chart, it became his second leader, after "The Box", while it marked Mustard's third consecutive Rhythmic number-one, following "Ballin" and "Pure Water".

Music video
On May 7, 2020, Ricch teased the song's video, tweeting "who wanna be in the high fashion video?". The lyric video for High Fashion was released on YouTube on March 13, 2020.

Personnel
Credits adapted from Tidal.
 GYLTTRYP – producer
 Dijon McFarlane – producer, featured artist, writer
 Curtis "Sircut" Bye – assistant engineer
 Zachary Acosta – assistant engineer
 Nicolas De Porcel – masterer
 Cyrus "NOIS" Taghipour – mixer
 Derek "MixedByAli" Ali – mixer
 Chris Dennis – recorded by
 Roddy Ricch – vocals, writer
 Shahrukh Zaman Khan – writer

Charts

Weekly charts

Year-end charts

Certifications

References

External links

2020 songs
2020 singles
Roddy Ricch songs
Mustard (record producer) songs
Atlantic Records singles
Songs written by Roddy Ricch
Song recordings produced by Mustard (record producer)
Songs written by Mustard (record producer)